Što svaka žena sanja (What Every Woman Dreams Of) is the seventeenth studio album by Bosnian folk singer Hanka Paldum. It was released 25 November 2013 through Hayat Production.

Track listing

Personnel

Production and recording
Damir Bečić – arrangement (7)
Almir Ajanović – arrangement (7)

Release history

References

2013 albums
Hanka Paldum albums
Hayat Production albums
Croatia Records albums